The 1992 Fangoria Chainsaw Awards ceremony, presented by Fangoria magazine and Creation Entertainment, honored the best horror films of 1991 and took place on May 16, 1992, at the Hilton Los Angeles Airport (5711 W. Century Blvd; formerly Hyatt) in Los Angeles, California. The ceremony was hosted by Bruce Campbell.

Ceremony
The event was held as part of the Fangoria annual Weekend of Horrors convention with Creation Entertainment; previously, the magazine had awarded the best in genre film through its Movie Poll Awards since 1981. Former magazine editor Tony Timpone informed the Los Angeles Times, "Fangoria has been giving out Movie Poll Awards for the last eleven years, but this year we decided to revamp it, add more categories and turn it into an actual ceremony."

The Evil Dead star Bruce Campbell hosted the event at the Hilton Los Angeles Airport (formerly the Hyatt), and included presenters such as Danielle Harris (Halloween 5: The Revenge of Michael Myers), Breckin Meyer (Freddy's Dead: The Final Nightmare), Jason Voorhees actor and stuntman Kane Hodder, directors Sam Raimi and Stuart Gordon, and B-movie scream queen Linnea Quigley.

The People Under the Stairs and Terminator 2: Judgment Day tied for most nominations with six each; however, The People Under the Stairs did not win in any category. Both films were eclipsed by The Silence of the Lambs which won four of its five nominations. Winners Jonathan Demme, Anthony Hopkins, Jodie Foster, Ted Tally, and Christina Ricci were not present to accept the award. Each sent an acceptance speech that was published in Fangoria.

Other attendees at the convention included Dario Argento, Clive Barker, special effects artist Gabe Bartalos, Michelle Bauer, Robert Clarke, Ken Foree, Monique Gabrielle, Mick Garris, Lance Henriksen, Anthony Hickox, Adrienne King, John Landis, Barbara Steele, and Brinke Stevens. Sneaks peeks included previews for the films Army of Darkness and Alien 3.

Presenters
John Skipp and Craig Spector — presented Best Soundtrack
Danielle Harris and Breckin Meyer — presented Best Supporting Actor & Best Supporting Actress
John Russo — presented Best Screenplay
Steve Johnson — presented Best Make-Up
Johnny Legend — presented Worst Film
Linnea Quigley — presented Best Actress
Kane Hodder — presented Best Actor
Bruce Campbell, Sam Raimi, and Robert Tapert — presented Best Independent/Low-Budget Film
Sam Arkoff — presented Best Big Budget/Studio Film
Stuart Gordon — presented Fangoria Hall of Fame Awards

Winners and nominees

Awards

Fangoria Hall of Fame Award
Jeffrey Combs
Lance Henriksen

References

External links
 1992 MTV Movie Awards on imdb

Fangoria Chainsaw Awards
Fangoria Chainsaw Awards
Fangoria Chainsaw Awards
1992 in Los Angeles
1992 in American cinema